Matthew H. Liang is a physician specializing in social rheumatology, Professor of Medicine at Harvard Medical School, Professor of Health Policy and Management at Harvard School of Public Health, and the Director of Special Projects of the Robert B. Brigham Arthritis and Musculoskeletal Diseases Clinical Research Center which he founded. At the Brigham and Women's Hospital he is Medical Director of Rehabilitation Services. He is a founding faculty of the Division of General Internal Medicine and Primary Care at the Brigham and Women's Hospital and a founding faculty of the  Clinical Effectiveness Program at the Harvard School of Public Health and is a Study Director in the Veterans Administration Cooperative Studies Program.

He is the author of History of the Robert Breck Brigham Hospital for Incurables: The First Teaching Hospital in America Specializing in Rheumatic and Orthopedic Conditions, and co-author (with Edward R. Lew) of Halsted R. Holman and the Struggle for the Soul of Medicine (2022).

Early life
Liang was born in California but grew up in Guangzhou, China.  A relative of Liang Qichao and Liang Sicheng, his grandfather originally migrated from the farming village of Jianlong 见龙 , Xinhui District in the province of Guangdong. His father, Ping Yee Liang, graduated from the first western-styled medical school, the Rockefeller-funded Peking Union Medical College in a class of 15 . His mother, Alice Kao, attended NYU Nursing School, and became head nurse in the newborn nursery at Johns Hopkins Hospital where she met Ping Yee. The family returned to China, but then fled in 1949 by truck to Macau and then Hong Kong, eventually settling in the United States.  He attended public schools and the Baltimore Polytechnic Institute, leaving before graduation to go to Johns Hopkins University.

Education
After Johns Hopkins, he went to Dartmouth Medical School and Harvard Medical School, where he earned his MD in 1969. After house staff training at the University of Minnesota and a locum in the Grenfell Mission, he studied tropical public health and epidemiology at the Harvard School of Public Health, earning a MPH in 1972. Afterwards, on the Harvard Medical Service at the Boston City Hospital  with the encouragement of Dr. Charles Davidson, he spent part of his residency as the founding internist of a neighborhood health center in Roxbury and worked with Roger Mark, a champion for inner city patients. Mark and Liang developed a Nursing Home Telemedicine system for over 400 residents of five nursing homes and showed that nurse practitioners could provide effective, economic care.

Career

Major Liang served in the US Army Medical Corps.  He implemented the Army's algorithm-based physician extender program (AMOSIST), and the first training program in general internal medicine and a chronic disease nurse practitioner program at Walter Reed Hospital. He also helped design the computerized hospital information system. After the service, he was a Robert Wood Johnson Clinical Scholar and a rheumatology fellow with Halsted Holman at Stanford.

In 1977 Liang was recruited to build a new NIH multipurpose arthritis center program at the old Robert Brigham Hospital and as a founding member of the new Division of Primary Care and General Medicine at the Peter Bent Brigham by K. Frank Austen, H. R. Nesson and Eugene Braunwald. The center became focused on population-based research and  pursued several lines of etiologic and methodologic research.

In the 80s, Liang and Martin Larson, Lawren Daltroy, and Bob Lew were asked to take responsibility for clinical research training in arthritis and musculoskeletal diseases. The program and others like it became a model for the National Institutes of Health pathway for clinician scientists. The trainees came from 8 countries; many went on to become leaders in their own right.

References

Sources

Liu Chang, Union Medical College building a century: science and humanity. Sanlian Life Weekly 40: 82-94, 2017.

Living people
American people of Chinese descent
Johns Hopkins University alumni
Harvard Medical School alumni
Geisel School of Medicine alumni
Harvard School of Public Health alumni
Harvard School of Public Health faculty
Geisel School of Medicine faculty
American rheumatologists
People from Santa Monica, California
Chinese Civil War refugees
American expatriates in China
1944 births